"We Need Some Money" is a single by the Washington, D.C.-based go-go band Chuck Brown & the Soul Searchers, which was released as a single in 1984. The song has been sampled by many hip-hop artists, including songs by Kid 'n Play and Wreckx-n-Effect, and is currently used in many promotional advertisements for the D.C. Lottery. Maryland rock band Clutch has long used a bootleg version of the song as their live-show introduction, and released a cover version on the deluxe version of their 2015 album Psychic Warfare.

Track listing
Side 1
"We Need Some Money" (radio version 1) – 4:28
"We Need Some Money" (radio version 2) – 4:53

Side 2
"We Need Some Money" (extended version) – 8:24

References

External links
 "We Need Some Money"  at Discogs.com

1984 songs
1984 singles
Chuck Brown songs